Operation Pedestal (Battle of mid-August), known in Malta as , was a British operation to carry supplies to the island of Malta in August 1942, during the Second World War. Malta was a base from which British ships, submarines and aircraft attacked Axis convoys to Libya, during the North African Campaign (1940–1943). From 1940 to 1942, the Axis conducted the Siege of Malta, with air and naval forces. Despite many losses, enough supplies were delivered by the British for the population and military forces on Malta to resist, although it ceased to be an offensive base for much of 1942. The convoy sailed from Britain on 3 August 1942 and passed through the Strait of Gibraltar into the Mediterranean on the night of 

The Axis attempt to prevent the fifty ships of the convoy reaching Malta, using bombers, German E-boats, Italian MAS and MS boats, minefields and submarine ambushes, was the last sizeable Axis success in the Mediterranean. While costly for the Allies, it was a strategic victory; the arrival of Ohio justified the decision to hazard so many warships; its cargo of aviation fuel revitalised the Maltese air offensive against Axis shipping. Submarines returned to Malta and Supermarine Spitfires flown from the aircraft carrier  enabled a maximum effort to be made against Axis ships. Italian convoys had to detour further away from the island, lengthening the journey and increasing the time during which air and naval attacks could be mounted. The Siege of Malta was broken by the Allied re-conquest of Egypt and Libya after the Second Battle of El Alamein (23 October – 11 November) and by Operation Torch (8–16 November) in the western Mediterranean, which enabled land-based aircraft to escort merchant ships to the island.

Background

Allied operations

The Allies waged the Western Desert Campaign (1940–43) in North Africa, against the Axis forces of Italy aided by Germany, which sent the Deutsches Afrika Korps and substantial Luftwaffe detachments to the Mediterranean in late 1940. Three convoys to Malta in 1941 suffered the loss of only one merchant ship. From January 1941 to August 1942,  ships had delivered  but  had been sunk and modern, efficient, merchant ships, naval and air forces had been diverted from other routes for long periods; 31 supply runs by submarines had been conducted. Reinforcements for Malta included  and dangerous aircraft carrier ferry operations to deliver fighters. From August 1940 to the end of August 1942,  and Supermarine Spitfire fighters had been flown off carriers in the western Mediterranean. Many other aircraft used Malta as a staging post for North Africa and the Desert Air Force.

Loaded ships sailing to Africa accounted for 90 percent of the ships sunk and Malta-based squadrons were responsible for about 75 percent of those ships sunk by aircraft. Military operations from Malta and using the island as a staging post, led to Axis air campaigns against the island in 1941 and 1942.

Malta, 1942

Operation Julius, a plan to supply Malta by simultaneous convoys from Gibraltar in Operation Harpoon and Alexandria by Operation Vigorous  was a costly failure. Only two merchantmen from Harpoon reached the island, the Vigorous convoy was forced to turn back, several convoy escorts and many merchantmen, including the only tanker in Harpoon, were sunk. Malta would be forced to surrender if fuel, food and ammunition were not delivered before September and Air Vice-Marshal Keith Park, the local air commander since July, warned that there remained only a few weeks' supply of aviation fuel. The British Admiralty had the fast minelayer  converted to carry fuel and submarines were pressed into service to run supplies of aviation fuel, anti-aircraft ammunition and torpedoes through the blockade, to keep the remaining aircraft operational. The First Lord of the Admiralty Albert Alexander and Admiral of the Fleet Dudley Pound, the First Sea Lord (professional head of the Royal Navy), concurred with the Prime Minister Winston Churchill that the loss of Malta would be

... and prepared a new convoy operation from Gibraltar, with an unprecedented number of escorts using ships taken from the Far East and from the Home Fleet, which had vessels to spare since the suspension of Arctic convoys, following the Convoy PQ 17 disaster.

Axis command
The Axis command structure in the Mediterranean was centralised at the top and fragmented at the lower levels. Benito Mussolini had monopolised authority over the Italian armed forces since 1933 by taking the offices of Minister of War, Minister of the Navy and Minister of the Air Force. Feldmarschall Albert Kesselring of the Luftwaffe commanded German ground forces in the theatre as Commander-in-Chief South but had no authority over Axis operations in North Africa or the organisation of convoys to Libya. Fliegerkorps II and Fliegerkorps X were subordinate to the usual Luftwaffe chain of command. Since November 1941, Kesselring had exercised some influence over the conduct of German naval operations in the Mediterranean as the nominal head of Naval Command Italy but this was subordinate to the Kriegsmarine chain of command. German inter-service rivalries obstructed co-operation and there was little unity of effort between German and the Italian forces in the Mediterranean. Kesselring had authority only to co-ordinate plans for combined operations by German and Italian forces and some influence on the use of the Regia Aeronautica (Italian Air Force) for the protection of convoys to North Africa. The Italian Navy resisted all German attempts to integrate its operations; ships in different squadrons never trained together and Supermarina (Italian Naval High Command) constantly over-ruled subordinate commanders.

Prelude

Allied plans

Operation Pedestal

Admiralty planning for Operation Pedestal began in late July 1942, under the direction of Vice-Admiral Neville Syfret, Rear Admirals Lumley Lyster and Harold Burrough and the Naval Staff. Syfret convened a conference on 29 July, for Flag and Commanding Officers of the naval forces for Pedestal at Scapa, to consider the orders for the operation. Several smaller operations were also planned, to be carried out concurrently with Pedestal. The convoy comprised 14 merchant vessels, the most important being Ohio, the only large, fast tanker available, a US ship loaned to the British, with a British crew. As insurance against the loss of Ohio and its  of oil, the other ships were to carry fuel in drums. The convoy was to be protected by two battleships, three aircraft carriers, seven cruisers, thirty-two destroyers and seven submarines, the largest escort force yet.

The combined group was named Force F; the convoy and escorts from Britain as far as the rendezvous, became Force P; the aircraft carriers Victorious, Argus and escorts were named Force M on the voyage to the meeting point.

Embarked on Victorious were 809 Squadron and 884 Squadron FAA with sixteen Fairey Fulmars and 885 Squadron with six Sea Hurricanes; on Indomitable, 806 Squadron had ten Grumman Martlets, 800 Squadron and 880 Squadron had twenty-four Sea Hurricanes, 827 Squadron and 831 Squadron had fourteen Fairey Albacores. On Eagle were 801 Squadron and 813 Squadron with sixteen Sea Hurricanes. Based on Malta were five Martin Baltimores, six PRU Spitfires and five Wellington Mk VIII reconnaissance aircraft. Reinforcements were sent temporarily from Egypt, raising the maximum number of operational aircraft to a hundred Spitfires, thirty-six Beaufighters, thirty Beauforts, three Wellingtons, two Liberators, two Baltimores and three FAA Albacores and Swordfish. The convoy was named WS.21S (Winston's Specials were troop convoys from Britain to Suez via the Cape of Good Hope). After the usual convoy conference just before sailing, Burrough met with the Convoy Commodore, A. G. Venables and the masters of the merchant ships on board his flagship,  to brief them. A similar meeting was held with radio operators of the merchantmen to explain fleet communications and procedures. Envelopes marked "Not to be opened until 08:00 hours August 10" were handed to the ships' masters, containing personal messages signed by the First Lord of the Admiralty wishing the masters "God Speed". The convoy sailed from the River Clyde on the night of  escorted by Nigeria,  and destroyers, to rendezvous with the other escorts the following morning.

Operation Bellows

Shortly before the departure from Scapa, the Admiralty decided that Furious should carry out Operation Bellows, to reinforce Malta (known informally as a Club Run) with Spitfires at the same time as Operation Pedestal. The departure of Furious was delayed by technical difficulties caused by the flight deck, which sloped upwards to a point amidships. The Spitfire was thrown into the air by the rise on the flight deck, bounced onto the forward slope, fell off the front near stalling speed and narrowly avoided ditching. An immediate request was made to the Air Ministry for constant-speed propellers and two days later, a Spitfire with the new propeller took off easily, leaving 38 aircraft still on board to be flown to Malta.

Operations Berserk and Ascendant

The risk to security in breaking W/T silence during the exercises, was accepted by Allied planners and according to Cunningham, the convoy attained efficiency in manoeuvring "comparable to that of a fleet unit." The aircraft of the force performed dummy air attacks in the afternoon of 8 August, to exercise radar reporting, the fighter direction organisation and to give anti-aircraft gun crews aircraft recognition practice, followed by a fly past. The Italian ship showed French recognition lights and the British destroyers ended the engagement; Force Y arrived at Gibraltar at about 10:00 on 14 August.)

Axis plans

The Germans and Italians planned separately and although they co-operated to an extent, Fliegerkorps II in Sicily co-ordinating plans with the local Regia Aeronautica commanders but conducting its attacks separately. Supermarina, the Italian Navy headquarters, considered four contingencies, that the Allies would use their naval strength to protect a convoy, the main Allied battle fleet would sortie to provoke a fleet action, to use a powerful covering force for a convoy to force a passage to the north of Pantelleria, instead of turning west at the entrance to Skerki Bank or to use aircraft-carriers for attacks on Sardinian airfields, to ease the passage of a convoy. The Regia Aeronautica had 328 aircraft (90 torpedo-bombers, 62 bombers, 25 dive-bombers and 151 fighters) and the Luftwaffe 456 aircraft (328 dive-bombers, 32 medium bombers and 96 fighters (most of the Luftwaffe torpedo-bombers had been sent to Norway in June and were too late for the operation). About 20 Junkers Ju 88s from Fliegerkorps X on Crete arrived at Sicily on 11 August, for operations the next morning and another eight  arrived from Crete the same day, after completing convoy escort operations in the Aegean.

The Regia Marina had four battleships, three heavy and ten light cruisers, twenty-one destroyers, twenty-eight torpedo boats and sixty-four submarines but most of the capital ships were non-operational for lack of fuel and air cover. The navy had received only  of fuel in June, equivalent to 20 percent of fuel consumption by convoys and the Italian battleships had to refuel the smaller vessels. Because of the fuel-shortage, Mussolini suggested to Hitler that a Malta convoy should be opposed only by submarines and land-based aircraft. Supermarina managed to prepare the 3rd Cruiser Division with the eight-inch cruisers Gorizia, Bolzano and Trieste and seven destroyers, along with the 7th Cruiser Division with the six-inch cruisers Eugenio di Savoia, Raimondo Montecuccoli and Muzio Attendolo and 5 destroyers plus 18 submarines, 19 torpedo boats (6 MS and 13 MAS); the Germans had 3 U-boats and 4 S-boats. The Axis air forces lacked the fighters to escort surface ships, bombers and torpedo bombers and Mussolini preferred to use the fighters as bomber escorts and as cover for surface forces. Kesselring rejected the Italian request to provide air cover for the Italian fleet, because the Luftwaffe did not have enough fighters.

Kesselring doubted that the Italian heavy cruisers could succeed even with air cover and thought that the Italians used the lack of fuel as a pretext. Admiral Eberhard Weichold, the German naval attaché in Rome, wanted the Luftwaffe to provide air cover for Italian ships. Marshal Ugo Cavallero, Chief of the General Staff , also wanted Italian surface forces to participate in the operation but Supermarina did not want its big ships to operate without air cover. Axis tactics were similar to those used against Operation Harpoon in June; a joint special air reconnaissance of the western Mediterranean to be flown by Axis aircraft on 11 and 12 August, Axis aircraft based in Sicily and Sardinia, Italian submarines and German U-boats and Axis torpedo boats and minefields being used as successive barriers. The four barriers were to cause the convoy to disperse and be vulnerable to a force of cruisers and destroyers. Twenty-two torpedo-bombers, about one hundred and twenty-five dive-bombers with fighter escorts and forty medium bombers were to be used in a synchronised attack. Priority was given to the destruction of aircraft carriers, to prevent them from intervening when Italian surface forces closed in on the remnants of the convoy. Ten submarines were to wait between Fratelli Rocks and the northern entrance to the Skerki Bank, some arrayed north-west of Cap Bon, to co-operate with aircraft.

From June 1940 to April 1942, the Regia Marina had laid about 2,320 mines between Cap Granitola at the south-west end of Sicily and Pantelleria, 1,020 mines between Pantelleria and Ras el Mustafa, Tunisia, 6,880 mines between the Aegadian Islands and Cap Bon and 1,040 mines between Bizerte and Keith Rock. The Italians also intended to lay a temporary minefield off Cap Bon on the night of 11/12 August, just before the convoy passed through. On the night of 12/13 August, thirteen MAS, six MS torpedo boats and four S-boats were to lie in wait south of Marettimo (an Aegadian Island) and off Cap Bon, then later to wait off Pantelleria. It was assumed that Axis aircraft could provide fighter cover against the larger number of British aircraft from Malta. Should an Allied convoy sail from Egypt, it would be attacked by the 8th Cruiser Division based at Navarino (Pylos) in Greece but the division was ordered into the Ionian Sea on 12 August, to support the 3rd Cruiser Division.

Axis preparations

Axis planners lacked information about Allied plans but had fair knowledge of the Allied order of battle and the movement of Allied forces inside the Mediterranean, from the reports of ship-watching stations near Gibraltar, reconnaissance aircraft and submarines. Reports from the Abwehr on 5 August convinced Kesselring that the Allies were preparing a big operation to supply Malta from the west, in conjunction with a simultaneous attack on Mersa Matruh in Egypt. Allied bombers from Malta were expected to attack Italian naval forces as Malta fighters covered the passage of a convoy through the Sicilian Narrows. The Germans also considered a threat to Crete when the convoy had reached Malta and Kesselring ordered increased readiness of Luftwaffe units in Sicily and Crete, aircraft being transferred from Crete to Sardinia and Sicily. Fliegerkorps II reduced operations to increase serviceability, prepared facilities at Elmas in Sardinia for reinforcements sent from Fliegerkorps X in the eastern Mediterranean. The Allies learned through Enigma that the Luftwaffe had supply difficulties in Sardinia, preventing the movement there of long-range bombers and of fighter operations to the extent intended and that the Luftwaffe had sent 40 to 45 long-range bombers and 6 twin-engined fighters from the eastern Mediterranean; Fliegerführer Afrika was forced to divert aircraft for convoy escorts in the Tobruk area.

The Italian submarine Uarsciek sighted the British ships at 04:30 on 11 August; the captain approached on the surface and fired three torpedoes, claiming a hit on the carrier in a 09:36 sighting report and during the evening a  photographed the fleet from high altitude, immune to anti-aircraft fire or FAA fighters. The Italian submarines were ordered into three patrol lines to intercept the convoy. On 12 August, Kesselring began discussions with Comando Supremo (Italian High Command) for the co-ordination of Axis forces for the forthcoming operation. During the morning Kesselring reported that the Luftwaffe was fully committed to bomber escort sorties, could not provide air cover for Italian ships and suggested laying mines but the Regia Marina had already laid one. The inability of the Luftwaffe to provide air cover for the Italian fleet greatly reduced its opportunities to intervene but the light cruiser  was sent with two destroyers from Naples to Messina.

At an afternoon meeting the surface ships were discussed again, the risk of attack from Malta-based aircraft led Cavallero to decide that the fleet could not be risked without sufficient protection by aircraft. The decision was taken to attack the convoy with submarines between Algiers and the Balearic Islands, torpedo boats between Cap Bon and Pantelleria and then the remnants of the convoy would be finished off by the 3rd and 7th Cruiser divisions General Rino Corso Fougier, the Regia Aeronautica chief of staff, had reported that 40 modern fighters and bombers were available and that the day before, 101 aircraft had transferred from Italy to Sardinia and Sicily, bringing the total to 247 but Superaereo would not begin attacks until 13 August. Radio-controlled bombers would be used to crash onto the aircraft carriers and  bombers from Crete and 10 torpedo-bombers from the training school at Grosseto had flown to Sardinia. In Sicily,  crews resting from operations were alerted and 6 Bf 110 long-range fighters were sent from Africa, bringing the Axis total to

Battle

9/10 August

Force R left Gibraltar on 9 August, ready to meet the convoy at a rendezvous south of Majorca; Force F made an uneventful passage of the Straits in dense fog during the night of  Fishing boats and one merchant vessel were passed at close quarters but due to the moonless night and the fog, Syfret thought it improbable that the force had been sighted from the shore. Abwehr agents near Gibraltar and Ceuta had sighted the convoy and the British decrypted their Enigma messages, learning how well-informed the Axis were and of their plans to defeat the convoy.

The convoy was expected to be south of Majorca by 06:00 on 11 August and south of Sardinia by the same time on 12 August. Fliegerkorps II in the western Mediterranean was alerted and Fliegerkorps X was ordered to reconnoitre the eastern Mediterranean beyond the 25° E line of longitude after dawn on 11 August.

11 August

Despite Axis submarines, three cruisers and twenty-six destroyers refuelled from the tankers Dingledale and Brown Ranger of Force R by dawn. (Previous Malta convoys had refuelled on arrival but now the island had no oil to spare.) The convoy was south of the Balearic Islands on course for Cap Bon at daybreak and at about 06:20, a U-boat sighted the convoy. Furious conducted the flying off between 12:30 and 15:15 of 38 Spitfires for the  journey to Malta and then turned round with her escorts for Gibraltar (37 of the aircraft reached Malta).

Three Axis submarines were seen departing Cagliari at 20:45 and the British learned that at 18:00 the 7th Cruiser Division with seventeen destroyers, had sailed east and that the 3rd Cruiser Division had departed from Messina and Naples. Allied intelligence also learned that Panzerarmee Afrika in Egypt believed that the convoy was a threat to Tobruk. Kesselring thought that a landing on the North African coast might be attempted and next day issued an order of the day, that landings by the Allies would influence operations in Africa and must be prevented. Luftgau Afrika (Air District Africa) expected a landing at Tripoli on 

At 08:00,  sighted ships out of range but behind them another group of merchantmen were followed by the carrier Eagle. The German submarine escaped, possibly due to layers of the sea being at different temperatures, affecting the ships' Asdic and after the torpedoing there were frequent false alarms. The Heinkels flew low to drop torpedoes and the  attacked out of the dusk in shallow dives, that evaded the fighters but anti-aircraft fire from the convoy shot down two  for no loss and then damaged several British fighters as they landed on. During the night the Axis airfields in Sardinia were attacked by B-24 Liberators and Beaufighters, which set a hangar on fire and destroyed several aircraft.

Night, 11/12 August

On the night of  the Italian 7th and 3rd Cruiser divisions and 17 destroyers sailed from Cagliari, Messina and Naples to engage the British convoy. The RAF at the Malta Operations Room sent orders in plain language to a Wellington bomber that dropped flares and sent messages in clear, supposedly guiding a fictitious B-24 Liberator force, to bluff the Italian ships away from the convoy. ( [Italian Naval Headquarters] had actually cancelled the operation before the British signals were received because of a lack of air cover.) At 00:20, the British discovered from Enigma that Italian intelligence had sighted four British cruisers and ten destroyers and thought that part of the convoy might be proceeding to the eastern Mediterranean. Enigma also revealed operation orders from Fliegerkorps II to the fighters of Jagdgeschwader 77 (JG 77) at Elmas in Sardinia, to expect a convoy in the Sicilian Narrows early on 12 August. Fliegerkorps II was to co-operate with the Regia Aeronautica in Sicily and Sardinia, flying in waves with fighter escorts against the convoy.

British intelligence concluded that the convoy and its huge escort force had caused the Axis commanders to be apprehensive of a landing anywhere along the North African coast or on Crete. Axis precautionary measures had been taken on the assumption that if Crete was the target, landings would occur before 14 August. Defensive measures were also taken in the Benghazi–Tripoli area of Libya, where a squadron of Messerschmitt Bf 109 fighters and the long-range bombers based at Derna were alerted to move to Benghazi or Tripoli, supported by Ju-52 transport aircraft. Panzerarmee Afrika prepared detachments to repel landings and moved forces to the Sollum–Mersa Matruh area, to defend the coast east of Tobruk. At 07:00, all ship movements from North Africa to Italy and the Aegean were suspended and by late afternoon, the British knew that the Luftwaffe anticipated a landing at Tripoli on 13 or 14 August. Fighter and dive-bomber reinforcements were sent from Sicily and Enigma intercepted a message from Reichsmarschall Hermann Göring, the commander in chief of the Luftwaffe, ordering that the Luftwaffe

and that the attacks were to be directed against the British aircraft carriers and merchantmen.

12 August

Morning

Axis aircraft resumed shadowing at 05:00 and at 06:10, Indomitable  sent Martlets to shoot down two  reconnaissance aircraft, which proved too high and too fast to intercept. Four Sea Hurricanes and Fulmars took off from the two carriers for air cover and every aircraft was readied to fly. German reconnaissance aircraft kept watch on the convoy, flying too high and fast for the FAA fighters. Four  were shot down and another two were claimed by navy anti-aircraft gunners (German records showed five shot down and two lost over Sardinia from mechanical failure) for the loss of one FAA fighter. The German crews made extravagant claims but did little damage and three Italian reconnaissance aircraft were also shot down. Beaufighters returning from a raid on Sardinia saw the 7th Cruiser Division (Da Zara) at sea and raised the alarm. The cruisers had sailed from Cagliari into the Tyrrhenian Sea at 08:10 on 11 August, escorted by the Maestrale-class destroyer Maestrale and the Oriani-class destroyers Oriani and Gioberti, to rendezvous with Attendolo from Naples.

British reconnaissance aircraft from Malta had flown over Italian ports, a Spitfire pilot saw that the 3rd Cruiser Division had left port and at 18:54 a Baltimore crew saw the Italian ships rendezvous. On Malta, Park was not disturbed until the convoy and escort losses of the day, which depleted Force X; five Wellington bombers were sent to find the Italian cruisers and 15 Beaufort torpedo-bombers and 15 Beaufighters stood by.

The biggest convoy attack came around noon from Sardinia-based aircraft; a wave of ten SM.84 bombers from 38° Gruppo BT and eight CR.42s of 24° Gruppo CT flying as bombers with 14 MC.202 escorts, followed after five minutes by nine Savoia-Marchetti SM.79s and ten SM.84 torpedo bombers attacking the starboard side of the convoy, escorted by 12 Re.2001 fighters and 21 SM.79s and 12 Re.2001s from the port side, all the bombers aiming for the merchant ships. The second wave had been delayed by 15 minutes due to a shortage of mechanics for the Re.2001s and only 31 aircraft could take off. The bombers were met by a big anti-aircraft barrage, the merchantmen took evasive action and none was hit by the bombers that managed to get into range. The third wave comprised a pair of Re.2001G/V fighter-bombers from the Sezione Speciale (Special Section), intended to carry  low-altitude armour-piercing bombs. The bombs were not ready and the aircraft carried anti-personnel bombs; the fighter-bombers were accompanied by a special radio-controlled SM.79, loaded with a  bomb and directed by Generale di brigata Ferdinando Raffaelli in a Cant Z1007.

The wave was escorted by two of the five Fiat G.50 fighters of the 24° Gruppo CT which managed to find the formation. The pilot of the SM.79 pointed the aircraft towards the ships and parachuted, Rafaelli in the Z.1007bis guiding the bomb by radio. The radio failed and the SM.79 flew straight on, instead of diving on one of the aircraft carriers as intended and crashed into Mount Khenchela in Algeria. The Sezione Speciale was mistaken for a Hurricane formation and both hit Victorious, one bomb killing six sailors and wounding two, the other bouncing off the deck and exploding over the sea. The first ten SM.84 bombers carried electric Motobomba FFF torpedoes which were designed to travel in an increasing spiral. The torpedoes were dropped  from the ships, which used the evasive manoeuvres practised in Operation Berserk to escape.

Between the second and third waves of Regia Aeronautica aircraft, 37 Ju 88s from Kampfgeschwader 54 (KG 54) and Kampfgeschwader 77 (KG 77) attacked, having flown from Sicily with 21 Bf 109 fighter escorts, after using radio-countermeasures to blind the British radar on Malta. Five aircraft had turned back with mechanical failures but the rest evaded four Fulmars. Two bombers, a torpedo-bomber and a fighter had been lost for one hit on Victorious and the damage to Deucalion. The quantity of anti-aircraft fire had led many aircrew to release their bombs and torpedoes early but the Italian aircraft from Sardinia could refuel and rearm to attack again and a Cant Z1007 and several Luftwaffe aircraft continued to shadow the convoy.

Enigma decrypts showed the British that at 18:30 on 12 August, an S-boat flotilla was due to sail at 16:00 from Porto Empedocle in Sicily for Cap Bon to operate in the area until about 04:30 on 13 August. At 21:45, a Fliegerkorps II assessment revealed that the Axis thought that there were fifty-one ships in the western Mediterranean, including two carriers, two battleships, seven cruisers and twenty destroyers. The Germans mistakenly thought that a US Yorktown-class aircraft carrier was present but correctly identified Rodney and Nelson. At 13:34 another Sunderland from 202 Squadron caused more damage but Giada shot down the flying boat before heading for Valencia (until 14 August) with one dead and eight wounded crewmen on board.

Afternoon

The convoy was approached at 16:30 by Emo, which manoeuvred into position to fire torpedoes at a carrier from  but a sudden course change led Franco to change targets, launch four torpedoes and dive. The convoy had changed course again and the torpedoes missed; observers on Tartar saw the torpedo tracks and raised the alarm. Lookout sped towards a periscope, which was that of  moving into an attack position and forced it to dive, spoiling its attack; at 17:40, Lookout returned to the convoy. At 16:49  was depth charged by  while at periscope depth, forced to the surface, engaged by gunfire and rammed by Ithuriel, sinking at 17:02. Ithuriel lost two crewmen who had boarded Cobalto to try keep the submarine afloat; two Italian seamen were lost and the rest were rescued by the British. Syfret had two destroyers on each flank of the convoy drop depth charges every ten minutes to deter submarines. (Many submarine alarms were possibly caused by ghost Asdic contacts, due to the warm waters of the Mediterranean.) 

The Regia Aeronautica units based in Sardinia managed to prepare eight Cr.42 dive-bombers and an escort of nine Re.2001 from 362°  and nine SM.79 bombers from Decimomannu. The SM.79s failed to find the convoy and a Re.2001 was shot down by an 806 Squadron Martlet from Indomitable. The convoy crossed the 10th parallel, beyond which aircraft based in Sicily could fly with fighter escorts and 105 aircraft prepared to attack in three waves. Problems with the fighter escorts were encountered because the Re.2001s of the 2°  had escorted the Sardinia-based bombers, landed in Sardinia and were not available until the next day. The torpedo- and dive-bombers were sent to Pantelleria to fly with the 51°  (MC.202s) and avoid the problems of co-ordination when aircraft flew from different bases. Four aircraft were sent on reconnaissance sorties; four of the Italian Ju 87s of 102°  were found to lack long-range tanks and torpedoes could not be attached to six SM.84s. Fulmars from Victorious shot down a SM.79 on reconnaissance but a Cant Z1007 maintained contact.  II arranged to co-ordinate with the Italians but the operations were independent. I , Sturzkampfgeschwader 3 (StG 3) had transferred from Trapani to Elmas and at 17:30 hrs, 20 Ju 87s with Bf 109 escorts took off.

Evening

Italian Ju 87s of 102° Gruppo arrived in poor visibility but at 18:35 the clouds parted. The Italian formation had been detected by radar while  out and three Martlets, twelve Sea Hurricanes and three Fulmars were airborne but faced MC.202 and Bf 109 escorts, the best Axis fighters. The dive- and torpedo-bomber attacks were well synchronised, the Ju 87s diving as the torpedo bombers approached in three waves at  The Ju 87s managed a near miss on Rodney with the  bomb exploding in the sea, one Stuka being shot down by a Hurricane and one by anti-aircraft fire. By 20:30, Indomitable had worked up to  but the damage to the flight deck left it out of action. Aircraft landed on Victorious but those that could not be accommodated were thrown overboard.

Charybdis, Lookout, Lightning and Somali gave assistance to Indomitable and the SM.79 torpedo-bombers were met with concentrated anti-aircraft fire. The ship was scuttled on the following day. A final Axis attack with twelve SM.79s and 28 Ju 87s cost two Ju 87s shot down and two damaged for no Allied loss; after returning to Pantelleria, the Axis aircraft were strafed by three Beaufighters, which flamed a  fuel depot, destroyed a Ju 52 and damaged two SM79s and an SM.84, also killing an Italian pilot caught on the airfield. The Axis air forces had flown  bomber sorties during the day and the Germans claimed that they had damaged an aircraft carrier, a cruiser, a destroyer and a large merchant ship. Both sides over-claimed, the British counted 39 shot-down aircraft against the true figure of 18 Axis aircraft lost; 3 Fulmars, 3 Sea Hurricanes and 1 Martlet had been shot down.

The loss of Eagle with its 16 aircraft and the damage to Indomitable which kept its 47 more aircraft out of action, reduced the number of operational fighters to 8 Sea Hurricanes, 3 Martlets and 10 Fulmars, as Force Z was due to leave the convoy, to remain outside the range of Axis aircraft based in Sardinia. Syfret had intended Force Z to turn west upon reaching the Skerki Bank at 19:15 but ordered the turn at 18:55 to get Indomitable out of danger. Rodney was having boiler trouble which slowed Force Z to  but because of the number of aircraft involved in the Axis attacks, Syfret thought that there could be no more before dark and that the danger at the Skerki Bank would come from after dawn. At 18:55, Burrough with the close escort of Force X continued towards Malta with the merchant ships and Force R cruised in the western Mediterranean in case it was needed, until ordered to return to Gibraltar (arriving in the morning of 16 August).

Night, 12/13 August

At about 20:00, the convoy manoeuvred from four to two columns to pass through the Skerki Channel, the starboard column with Kenya in the lead and Manchester sixth back, the port column with Nigeria leading and Carlisle in the centre, ten destroyers sailing outside the columns. The sound of the detonations turned out to be from torpedoes fired by  hitting Nigeria with 52 men killed,  and Ohio blowing a hole  in its side and starting a fire; the crew put out the fire and were soon able to make .

KG 54 and KG 77 dispatched 30  with seven He 111 torpedo-bombers from 6/KG 26 escorted by six Bf 110s of 6/ZG 26 and the destroyers were still with the damaged ships and when the raid was detected by radar at 20:35; six long-range Beaufighters of 248 Squadron arrived and were also fired on by the convoy gunners. Ashanti and  laid a smokescreen to cover the light western horizon, the sun having set at 20:10 but the reduced anti-aircraft firepower of the convoy and escorts failed to prevent the attack. Clan Ferguson was torpedoed and set ablaze, later to be destroyed by an ammunition detonation, Rochester Castle was damaged and Empire Hope was sunk by a destroyer after rescuing the crew. At 21:05 Alagi fired a salvo of four torpedoes at Kenya, the tracks of which were seen on Port Chalmers and reported. Kenya turned sharply and avoided three of the torpedoes but the fourth hit aft on the starboard side; Kenya was able to keep up but this left Force X with Manchester as the only undamaged cruiser.  reported that it had sunk Deucalion and the captain of Kenya described the state of the convoy as "chaotic". At 21:30, the commander of Alagi reported that he had sunk the merchant ship Empire Hope and damaged Kenya and that

At 23:56, the convoy passed south of Zembra Island towards Kelibia on Cap Bon, to avoid the minefields between Africa and Sicily, still out of formation. Three minesweeping destroyers sailed ahead, followed by the cruisers Kenya, Manchester and two freighters. Charybdis and the destroyers Eskimo and Somali from Force Z were still some hours behind and Ashanti was steaming fast to overhaul the main body. Three destroyers remained with nine of the merchantmen and Bramham was en route after Deucalion had been sunk. The main part of the convoy was attacked at 00:40 by four boats of the German III Squadron and thirteen torpedo boats of the Italian 18° MAS, 2° MS and 20° MAS, which made 15 attacks; the long line of merchant ships and the reduced number of escort ships providing an easy target. The 18° MAS detected the convoy on radar, south-east of Pantelleria and attacked the escorts at the head of the procession, coming under fire, as they fired torpedoes to no effect. The Italian boats then attacked the merchant ships.

S 58 and S 59 sighted the first ships at 00:20, attacked and S 58 was damaged, turning away for Port Empedocle. At 01:02 near Ras Mustafa south of Kelibia, MS 16 or MS 22 attacked the convoy to no effect but then attacked Manchester from close range and each scored a hit, flooding its boilers, fuel tanks and magazines and that wrecking three of its four propeller shafts, the ship taking on a 12° list until counter-flooding reduced the list to 5°. ,  and Glenorchy following on, swerved around Manchester and lost formation. Glenorchy mistakenly claimed the destruction of a torpedo boat and the two MAS boats ran aground in Tunisia. Power was restored on Manchester and 156 men were taken on board Pathfinder but at 05:00, the captain ordered the ship be scuttled and the remaining crew to make for the Tunisian coast.

Ohio and its destroyer were slowly closing the distance and further back were Port Chalmers and two destroyers. Dorset was sailing independently and Brisbane Star lurked near the Tunisian coast, ready to make a run for Malta after dark. Dawn brought an end to the torpedo boat attacks and at 07:30, Burrough sent Eskimo and Somali back to help Manchester but they arrived too late, took on survivors who had not reached the shore and made for Gibraltar.

13 August

Morning

At 01:30 the cruisers had turned east and run along the north coast of Sicily; British aircraft from Malta had conducted a ruse to decoy the cruisers but the main attacking force on Malta was held back, in case the Italian battleships sailed from Taranto. The Italian cruisers were heard first by hydrophone and then seen through the periscope at 07:25, heading north between the islands of Filicudi and Panarea. The ships were making  with eight destroyer escorts and two CANT Z.506 aircraft overhead. Her commander raised the periscope for only short periods, to avoid being seen by the destroyers and the Cants, while manoeuvring into an attack position.

The Italian destroyers chased several Asdic contacts and three sailed within  of Unbroken, which fired four torpedoes after they had passed by. Observers on Gorizia and Bolzano had seen torpedo tracks and Gorizia was turned sharply but Bolzano was hit while beginning its turn. The deck crew of Muzio Attendolo had not seen the torpedo tracks or received the alert from Fuciliere and the ship took evasive action only after Bolzano was hit, which was too late. The destroyers detected Unbroken at 08:45 and accurately dropped 105 depth charges in the next 45 minutes but at too shallow a depth. Two destroyers escorted Gorizia and Trieste to Messina and five remained with Bolzano and Muzio Attendolo, periodically dropping depth charges as a deterrent.

Bolzano was struck amidships, six engine rooms and a magazine flooded and a fire started, the commander of the 11th Destroyer Flotilla being ordered to tow the ship and run it aground on Panarea. Bolzano burned until the next day, watched over by Italian fighters and after a month of repairs, was towed to Naples. Muzio Attendolo was damaged for the duration of the war, and Bolzano was destroyed in June 1944, in an attack by two British human torpedo craft. After remaining submerged for ten hours, Unbroken surfaced and was recalled to Malta. (Supermarina had re-routed the cruiser force after a submarine (Unbroken) had been detected, which had been predicted by Mars, enabling him to forestall the Italians, who broke orders by not zigzagging and by slowing. After the incident, Supermarina assumed that the submarine had escaped because Italian depth charges were not powerful enough, rather than the Asdic-equipped ships had been hampered by the turbulence of destroyer wakes and depth charge explosions.)

Trailing behind were Dorset and Port Chalmers with two destroyers and two more off to the west. Brisbane Star was in the Gulf of Hammamet and south of Pantelleria were six British submarines. Fliegerkorps II sent 26  in several waves and at 09:15, 16 Ju 87s escorted by eight Bf 109s and eight Bf 110s attacked. Ten  of II/LG 1 near missed Ohio and hit Waimarama which disintegrated; the aviation fuel on deck burst into flame and one of the bombers was destroyed in the explosion.  passed through the fires, rescuing 27 survivors of the ship's complement of 107 men.

At 09:23, eight Italian Ju 87s with ten MC.202 escorts attacked and a Stuka was shot down and crashed onto Ohio, another was shot into the sea and a Spitfire was shot down, either by a MC.202 or navy anti-aircraft fire. The attackers lost two Ju 87s and a Bf 109 and a Beaufighter was shot down. Port Chalmers was hit and at 11:25, five SM.79 torpedo-bombers, with 14 MC.202 escorts, attacked and the crew found a torpedo caught in the starboard paravane, which exploded harmlessly. An SM.79 was shot down by a Spitfire and two destroyers were left behind with the disabled ships.

Afternoon

The remnants of the convoy steamed on to meet the four minesweepers and seven motor minesweepers of the 17th Minesweeper Flotilla of the Malta Escort Force at 14:30. Melbourne Star, Port Chalmers and Rochester Castle reached Grand Harbour at Valletta at 16:30, where Operation Ceres, the immediate unloading of the ships began. Another air attack at dusk by 14 Ju 87s, sank Dorset but when the main body was within  of Malta, 18  were recalled in the face of 407 Spitfire sorties from the island. Penn tried to tow Ohio but the tanker was listing and snapped the tow line; in a later attack, a bomb hit the same area as a previous torpedo hit and broke Ohios keel. The last ship to arrive, Brisbane Star evaded a U-boat and managed to steam at  despite the damage to its bows. Off Tunisia, Brisbane Star was attacked by two SM.79 torpedo bombers, whose torpedoes turned out to be duds. The ship evaded Italian MAS boats; it was then boarded by the Sousse harbour master, who tried to impound the vessel until persuaded to relent and let the ship sail on after dark. Ledbury was attacked by two SM.79s but shot them down. Force X had turned for Gibraltar at 16:00 with the cruisers Charybdis, Kenya and five destroyers; Fliegerkorps II made a maximum effort against the force, which made it easier for the remaining merchant ships to reach Malta. The Regia Aeronautica attacked with 15 bombers and 20 torpedo-bombers for no loss and during the afternoon, Force X met Force Z, the ships being attacked by aircraft, submarines and light craft; Foresight was scuttled by Tartar when it could no longer sail. Eskimo and Somali, carrying survivors from Manchester were the last to reach Gibraltar at 17:30 on 15 August.

Operations MG 3 and MG 4

In the eastern Mediterranean, the decoy operation MG 3 had begun when convoy MW12 with three freighters had sailed from Port Said after dusk on 10 August. The merchant ships were escorted by two cruisers, ten destroyers and two smaller escorts and another merchant ship escorted by two cruisers and three destroyers left Haifa at 03:00 the next day. The two forces rendezvoused early on 11 August and sailed west to the longitude of Alexandria, then turned back. U-83 had reported that four cruisers and ten destroyers were close to Crete and a message from a Sunderland was intercepted. Reconnaissance reports from Malta noted a smokescreen over Valletta, apparently to conceal two cruisers but this was later taken to mean that the British were hiding the departure of ships heading west towards the convoy. The large size of the convoy was interpreted by Supermarina to imply an operation in the eastern Mediterranean and prepared to reinforce the 8th Cruiser Division at Navarino.

Kesselring thought that the convoy was a British wireless-telegraphy spoof but might also be a supply convoy for Malta and Fliegerkorps X was ordered to reconnoitre all of the eastern Mediterranean on the morning of 12 August but no aircraft were available to cover the Italian cruisers, operations against the convoy taking priority. During the day, the RAF attacked Maritsa airfield on Rhodes and a British submarine landed Commandos on the east coast of Sicily (a False Nose Job) at Simeto south of Catania, to sabotage electricity pylons. The Italian 8th Cruiser Division remained in port and the Germans detached a destroyer to reinforce the Italians; local traffic along the North African coast and shipping between Italy and Greece was suspended but MG 3 failed to divert Axis attention from Operation Pedestal.

14–15 August

On the afternoon of 14 August, Brisbane Star arrived at Valletta Harbour with Spitfires circling overhead. Ohio was surrounded by ships to nurse the tanker to Grand Harbour and several American volunteers from Santa Eliza manned anti-aircraft guns on Ohio during the tow. The weight of the tanker kept breaking the tow lines, while constant air attacks were made by 20 bombers that destroyed the rudder, made a hole in her stern and brought the decks awash. The tanker was towed in by the destroyers Ledbury and Penn lashed on either side, with the minesweeper  acting as a stabiliser at the stern. More air attacks disrupted the towing formation, until it was re-established with Bramham replacing Ledbury for the remainder of the journey. Ohio was towed into Grand Harbour at 09:30 on 15 August, to cheering crowds and a band playing Rule Britannia. The crowd fell silent as the ships entered harbour, men removed their hats, women crossed themselves and a bugle sounded Still. The tanker discharged oil into two tankers and water was pumped in at the same time, to reduce the chance of structural failure. Ohio settled on the bottom just as the last of the fuel was emptied.

The surviving ships' cargo was unloaded in Malta by about 3,000 soldiers before being transferred to guarded stores. Some supplies were looted in the process; the looters included police officers, watchmen, British soldiers and Maltese civilians.

Aftermath

Analysis

German reports on 17 August claimed that all the tankers in the recent Mediterranean convoy had been sunk and none of the transports had reached their destination (assumed to be Egypt). The Allies had lost thirteen vessels, including nine merchantmen, one aircraft carrier (Eagle), two cruisers (Manchester and Cairo) and a destroyer (Foresight) but the Royal Navy and the Merchant Navy had saved Malta. Axis propaganda broadcasts made extravagant claims but a Kriegsmarine report noted the incomplete and contradictory evidence, allowing only a provisional conclusion.

In August, with Malta still besieged, 35 per cent of Axis convoy shipping to North Africa was lost. Later that year, Admiral Eberhard Weichold summed up the  view,

In 1994, James Sadkovich wrote that Operation Pedestal was a tactical disaster for the British and that it was of a magnitude comparable to the German attack on Convoy PQ 17. In 2000, Richard Woodman called Operation Pedestal a strategic victory, raising the morale of the people and garrison of Malta, averting famine and an inevitable surrender. In 2002, Giorgio Giorgerini wrote that the operation was an Italian success; Italian submarines had adopted more offensive tactics and sunk a cruiser and two merchantmen, damaged two cruisers and the tanker Ohio. In 2002, Jack Greene and Alessandro Massignani called the convoy operation the last Axis victory in the Mediterranean but that it was a tactical not a strategic success. The arrival of Ohio justified the convoy despite the loss of nine of the merchant ships (one in Valletta harbour). On 15 August, Lerici was also sunk by Porpoise and on 17 August, Pilo was sunk by aircraft and the tanker Pozarica was sunk on 21 August.

Casualties

In 2003, Ian Malcolm listed 160 men killed on Eagle, 132 on Manchester, 52 on Nigeria, fifty on Indomitable, 24 on Cairo, 5 on Foresight, three on Kenya. Merchant Navy casualties were 83 on Waimarama, eighteen on Clan Ferguson, seven on Glenorchy, five on Melbourne Star, four on Santa Elisa, one on Deucalion, one on Ohio and one on Brisbane Star. In 2010, Milan Vego wrote that about 350 men had been killed, Ohio never sailed again and the British lost a carrier (Eagle), two cruisers (Manchester and Cairo) and the destroyer Foresight. A carrier (Indomitable), two cruisers (Nigeria and Kenya) and three destroyers were damaged and under repair for some time. On the Axis side, Two Italian cruisers (Bolzano and Muzio Attendolo) were damaged and not operational for the rest of the war, the Italian submarines Cobalto and Dagabur were sunk, the Italian submarine Giada and the German E-Boat S58 were damaged.

 II sent  against Pedestal from 11 to 14 August and claimed twelve aircraft shot down for eighteen losses. Total Axis losses were 62 aircraft, 42 Italian and 19 German, including losses on the ground and those shot down by their own side. The Fleet Air Arm lost thirteen aircraft on operations and sixteen Sea Hurricanes when Eagle was sunk, the RAF lost a Beaufighter and five Spitfires; a Sunderland was shot down by Giada. The Allies could not risk such losses again and another large convoy to Malta was not attempted until November 1942, when the re-capture of airfields in Egypt and Libya after the Second Battle of El Alamein made it much easier to provide land-based air cover.

Subsequent operations

From 16 to 18 August,  made another Club Run from Gibraltar and dispatched  to Malta in Operation Baritone. In September and October, Malta was supplied by the submarines (on the Magic Carpet run and  sailed during the operation with ammunition, aviation fuel and torpedoes). In September, with Malta revictualled, Allied forces sank  of Axis shipping, including  of fuel destined for Rommel, leaving the Axis forces in Egypt consuming supplies faster than receipts, contributing to tactical paralysis during the Second Battle of El Alamein  and Operation Torch  Submarines and Bristol Beaufort torpedo-bombers, escorted by Bristol Beaufighters, regularly attacked Axis supply ships, concentrating on tankers, known to the Allies through Ultra intercepts from Bletchley Park. An attempt to run a disguised merchant ship to Malta early in November failed and then Operation Stoneage  a convoy of four merchant ships from Alexandria, arrived undamaged (the light cruiser Arethusa was torpedoed with 155 men killed and had to be towed back to port). Force K was re-established at Malta and in Operation Portcullis  five ships were dispatched and arrived safely. Chariot manned torpedoes began to operate from Malta that month and from late December to January 1943, four convoys, Quadrangle A, B, C and D, with pairs of merchantmen in each, delivered  of stores without loss; empty ships were retrieved from the island.

Commemoration
In recognition of their fortitude during the siege and air attacks during all of the Mediterranean campaign, Malta was awarded the George Cross in the months immediately preceding this operation. Vice-Admiral Syfret was appointed as a Knight Commander of the Order of the Bath for his "bravery and dauntless resolution in fighting an important convoy through to Malta in the face of relentless attacks by day and night from enemy submarines, aircraft, and surface forces." The master of the tanker Ohio, Dudley Mason, was awarded the George Cross for showing "skill and courage of the highest order and it was due to his determination that, in spite of the most persistent enemy opposition, the vessel, with her valuable cargo, eventually reached Malta and was safely berthed." Several other officers, crew members and commanders of both the Royal and Merchant Navies, including the commander of HMS Ledbury, Roger Hill, received military awards ranging from the Distinguished Service Order and Conspicuous Gallantry Medal to Mentioned in Despatches, for the bravery shown in ferrying the merchantmen to Malta. The United States' Merchant Marine Distinguished Service Medal was awarded to Junior Third Officer Frederick August Larsen, Jr. and to Cadet-Midshipman, US Merchant Marine Academy, Francis A. Dales for "Heroism beyond the call of duty" for their conduct aboard the Santa Elisa and Ohio. Operation Pedestal was the subject of a 1953 black and white British film, Malta Story, that interspersed archive footage of Ohio with scripted studio scenes.

Order of battle
AlliesForce FConvoy WS.21S Freighters: MV Empire Hope, MV Dorset, MV Wairangi, MV Rochester Castle, SS Waimarama, MV Port Chalmers, MV Clan Ferguson, MV Glenorchy, MV Deucalion
 Oil tanker: 
 Battleships
 
 
 Aircraft carriers
 (6 Sea Hurricanes, 16 Fulmars, 12 Albacores)
  (16 Sea Hurricanes)(sunk)
  (damaged) (10 Martlets, 24 Sea Hurricanes, 16 Albacores)
 Total 74 fighters, 28 torpedo bombers
 Light cruisers
 19th Destroyer Flotilla
  (damaged),  (damaged),  (severely damaged and scuttled),  (sunk)
 6th Destroyer Flotilla
 Ocean tug
 JauntyForce Y – two merchant ships with escort making overnight run from Malta to Gibraltar
 Freighters: Troilus, Orari
 Destroyers: , Force R Fleet oil tankers: RFA Brown Ranger, RFA Dingledale
 Corvettes
 Ocean tug
 Malta Escort Force 17th Minesweeping Flotilla
 Motor launches: ML 121, ML 126, ML 134, ML 135, ML 168, ML 459, ML 469
 10th Submarine Flotilla
 ,  (off Milazzo and Palermo)
  (38 Spitfires to 11 August)Reserve Escort Group Destroyers
 3 merchant vessels: 2 cruisers, 10 destroyers as escort
 Convoy MW 12 (Haifa section)
 1 Merchant vessel: 2 cruisers, 3 destroyers as escortOperation MG 4 Rhodes attack force
 2 cruisers, 4 destroyersAircraft operational on Malta 9 fighter squadrons
 3 torpedo-bomber squadrons
 4 bomber squadrons
 2 reconnaissance squadrons
 38 Spitfires (ex-Furious) from 11 August

AxisNaval forces3rd Cruiser Division (Messina)
 Heavy cruisers
 Destroyers
 Light cruisers
 Destroyers
 Minelaying destroyer
  (to mine Sicilian Narrows)8th Cruiser Division (Navarino)
 Light cruisers
 Destroyers
 5Submarines Italian
 German
 MS 16, MS 22, MS 23, MS 25, MS 26, MS 31
 15th MAS Squadron
 MAS 549, MAS 543, MAS 548, MAS 563
 18th MAS Squadron
MAS 556, MAS 553, MAS 533, MAS 562, MAS 560
 20th MAS Squadron
 MAS 557, MAS 554, MAS 564, MAS 552
 S-boats
 S 30, S 59, S 58, S 36Aircraft on Sicily and Sardinia Regia Aeronautica
287th, 146th, 170th, 144th, 197th squadriglie
(90 torpedo bombers, 62 bombers, 25 dive-bombers, 151 fighters)
 Luftwaffe
Fliegerkorps II
(328 dive bombers, 32 bombers, 96 fighters)

Axis aircraft total: 784 (328 Italian, 456 German)

See also
Bonner Fellers

Notes

Footnotes

ReferencesBooks 
 
 
 
 
 
 
 
 
 
 
 
 
 
 
 
 
 
 
 
 
 
 Journals ReportsNewspaper articles Websites 

Further readingBooks 
 
 
 
 
 
 
 
 
 
 
 
 
 
 
 
 
 Theses Websites'

External links

 The Supply of Malta
 Operation Pedestal and SS Ohio save Malta
 Times of Malta: Sta Marija Convoy Surviving Crewmen for Malta Reunion, Fiona Galea Debono; 15 July 2002
 Times of Malta: Survivor from Sta Marija Convoy tells his experience by Fiona Galea Debono, 13 August 2006
 Battaglia di Mezzo Agosto: Plancia di Commando 
 ADM 199/1242 Catalogue entry for the official reports on the operation, held by The National Archives
 ADM 199/1243 Catalogue entry for the official reports on the operation, held by The National Archives
 Newsreel: The Battle of the Convoys 
 Newsreel: Malta Convoy – Further Pictures 
 Newsreel: Malta Convoy Battle 
 Operation Pedestal
 Documentary: Malta Convoy, courtesy of the IWM

1942 in Malta
20th century in Malta
Aerial operations and battles of World War II involving the United Kingdom
Italian naval victories in the battle of the Mediterranean
Conflicts in 1942
Malta Convoys
Naval aviation operations and battles
Naval battles and operations of the European theatre of World War II
Naval battles of World War II involving Italy
Naval battles and operations of World War II involving the United Kingdom
August 1942 events
WS (Winston Special) Convoys